Fernando Borello (born 12 February 1980) is an Argentine sports shooter. He competed in the men's trap event at the 2016 Summer Olympics.

References

External links
 

1980 births
Living people
Argentine male sport shooters
Olympic shooters of Argentina
Shooters at the 2016 Summer Olympics
Place of birth missing (living people)
Pan American Games medalists in shooting
Pan American Games silver medalists for Argentina
Shooters at the 2015 Pan American Games
Medalists at the 2015 Pan American Games